Gagnebin is a surname. Notable people with the surname include:

Elie Gagnebin (1891–1949), Swiss geologist
Henri Gagnebin (1886–1977), Belgian-born Swiss composer
Laurent Gagnebin (born 1939), Swiss philosopher and Protestant theologian